Olga Sherbatykh (born 2 May 1988) is a Ukrainian former artistic gymnast. She participated at the 2004 Summer Olympics. She also competed at world championships, including the 2008 Artistic Gymnastics World Cup Final in Madrid, Spain.

See also 
 List of Olympic female artistic gymnasts for Ukraine

References

External links
 
 

1988 births
Living people
Ukrainian female artistic gymnasts
Place of birth missing (living people)
Gymnasts at the 2004 Summer Olympics
Olympic gymnasts of Ukraine
21st-century Ukrainian women